N23 may refer to:

Roads
 N23 road (Belgium)
 Route nationale 23, in France
 N23 road (Ireland)
 Nebraska Highway 23, in the United States

Other uses
 N23 (Long Island bus)
 Escadrille N23, a squadron of the French Air Force
 Nieuport 23, a French First World War fighter
 Nitrogen-23, an isotope of nitrogen
 Northrop N-23 Pioneer, an American transport aircraft
 Sidney Municipal Airport (New York), in Delaware County, New York, United States